{{DISPLAYTITLE:C21H32O5}}
The molecular formula C21H32O5 may refer to:

 5α-Dihydrocortisol, a metabolite of cortisol that is formed by 5α-reductase
 Tetrahydrocortisone, a steroid and an inactive metabolite of cortisone